Yuriy Petrovych Kulish (born 22 August 1963) is a Ukrainian professional football coach and a former player.

He has worked as an assistant to Leonid Kuchuk in several clubs.

European club competitions
 1989–90 European Cup with FC Dnipro Dnipropetrovsk: 4 games.
 1990–91 UEFA Cup with FC Chornomorets Odesa: 2 games.

References

External links
 

1963 births
Living people
Footballers from Dnipro
Soviet footballers
Ukrainian footballers
Association football defenders
Ukrainian expatriate footballers
Expatriate footballers in Russia
Expatriate footballers in Moldova
Expatriate footballers in Sweden
Expatriate footballers in Belarus
Ukrainian expatriate sportspeople in Moldova
Soviet Top League players
FC Dnipro Cherkasy players
FC Kaisar players
FC Sokol Saratov players
FC Rotor Volgograd players
FC Chornomorets Odesa players
FC Dnipro players
CS Tiligul-Tiras Tiraspol players
FC Nyva Ternopil players
MFC Mykolaiv players
FC Transmash Mogilev players
FC Dnister Ovidiopol players
Ukrainian football managers
Ukrainian expatriate football managers
Expatriate football managers in Moldova
FC Tiraspol managers
FC Krystal Kherson managers
FC Real Pharma Odesa managers
Moldovan Super Liga managers
FC Nosta Novotroitsk players
FC Dynamo Kirov players